Georgia Fuller is a women's rights activist who was heavily involved in the political struggle for the Equal Rights Amendment in the 1980s. She was a member of the Congressional Union, a feminist group in the 1980s, and was co-founder of the Arlington, Virginia chapter of the National Organization for Women (NOW).

Involvement with National Organization for Women 
Fuller was heavily involved with the Virginia chapter of NOW and founded the Arlington chapter in 1975. As part of her work with NOW, she was an advocate for LGBT rights, the Equal Rights Amendment and reproductive rights. At the 1981 conference, Fuller participated in a group called Congressional Union that called for more direct action to put pressure on the White House to support the ERA. The Congressional Union was active in the early 1980s and took its name from the original Congressional Union for Women's Suffrage founded by Alice Paul, the original author of the ERA. During the 1981, conference, Fuller wore chains to emphasize the militant tactics that were coming to publicly support the ERA.

Fuller continued to be involved with NOW throughout the 1980s. During that decade, she was also politically active with LGBTQ+ issues as she helped organize a conference to discuss homophobia in the church.

NOW's Task Force on Women and Religion 
Fuller was active with a variety of faith based social justice groups and served as co-coordinator of the National Organization for Women's Task Force on Women and Religion. When Sonia Johnson was excommunicated from the Church of Jesus Christ of Latter-day Saints for supporting the ERA, Fuller organized a prayer vigil on her behalf. Another notable feminist who was involved with this group was Elizabeth Farians, one of the co-founders of NOW.

Militant actions for the ERA 
Fuller was part of an organization called A Group of Women who undertook militant action on behalf of the ERA in the early 1980s. Sonia Johnson also belonged to this organization and took part in a variety of political campaigns alongside Fuller. These non-violent direct action tactics involved smearing red paint that looked like blood on the front of the National Archives. She was also part of a group of twenty women who went on a hunger strike to increase awareness of this amendment.

Chained to the White House fence 
On August 26, 1982, Women's Equality Day, Fuller and a group of women chained themselves to the White House fence to protest inaction over the ERA.  Charlotte Bunch and Fuller gave speeches in Lafayette Park as supporters burned candles. The words of President Ronald Reagan were burned in bathtubs and the press reported the women as "latter day suffragettes." Fuller encouraged the comparison to the suffragists of the 1910s saying, "As the suffragette burned the words of Wilson, we in the same spirit burn the words of Reagan. And as our fore-mothers set watch-fires of freedom at the same site, we as American women ignite the watch-fires of equality."

Climbing the White House fence 
On Susan B. Anthony's birthday, February 15, 1982, Fuller and 9 other women climbed over the White House fence to raise awareness for the need of an ERA. This was an organized action undertaken by the Washington, D.C. chapter of the Congressional Union

Personal life 
Fuller, a Quaker, was born in 1945 and has one son. As of 2020, Fuller continued to give public presentations sharing her personal history about working for the ERA. In her later years, Fuller has been active with the Silver Panthers.

See also 

 A Group of Women
 Berenice A. Carroll
 Grassroots Group of Second Class Citizens
 Maureen Fiedler
 Sonia Johnson
 National Woman's Party
 Zoe Nicholson

References 

Living people
1945 births
Equal Rights Amendment activists
Women's rights activists
Feminists
Radical feminists
National Organization for Women people